Nada Vilotijević (born July 8, 1953) is a Serbian University professor at Teacher Training Faculty in Belgrade (University of Belgrade) and author. She works and resides in Belgrade, Serbia, and has published over 10 books. She is married to Mladen Vilotijević with whom she has one son, Viktor Vilotijević.

See also
Vilotijević

References

1953 births
Living people
20th-century Serbian writers
Academic staff of the University of Belgrade
People from Vrbas, Serbia
Serbian educators
Serbian women writers